Hendrika "Rie" Wilhelmina Mastenbroek (26 February 1919 – 6 November 2003) was a Dutch swimmer and a triple Olympic champion.

Biography
Born in Rotterdam, she started swimming under the coaching of "Ma" Braun, who had coached her daughter to an Olympic gold medal in 1928. In 1934, Mastenbroek won three gold medals and a silver at the European Championships.

She repeated that performance at the 1936 Summer Olympics, aged only 17, winning the 100 m freestyle, 400 m freestyle and the 4×100 m freestyle. In the 100 m backstroke, she finished second behind teammate Nida Senff. (Senff missed a turning point and had to swim back before completing the last 50 m. She nevertheless beat Mastenbroek thanks to an outstanding last leg.)

The following year she became a swimming instructor, thereby losing her amateur status and becoming ineligible for competition.

During her career she broke nine world records (six for backstroke and three for freestyle). In 1968 she was inducted into the International Swimming Hall of Fame. In 1997 she received the Olympic Order.

She died at age 84 in Rotterdam. After her death, Stichting Aquarius named the Rie Mastenbroek Trophy after her.

See also
 List of members of the International Swimming Hall of Fame

References

1919 births
2003 deaths
Olympic swimmers of the Netherlands
Swimmers at the 1936 Summer Olympics
Swimmers from Rotterdam
Olympic gold medalists for the Netherlands
Olympic silver medalists for the Netherlands
World record setters in swimming
Medalists at the 1936 Summer Olympics
Dutch female freestyle swimmers
Dutch female backstroke swimmers
European Aquatics Championships medalists in swimming
Recipients of the Olympic Order
Olympic gold medalists in swimming
Olympic silver medalists in swimming
20th-century Dutch women